SSM Health Cardinal Glennon Children's Hospital is a non-profit 195-bed inpatient and outpatient pediatric medical center in St. Louis, Missouri. Since its founding in 1956, SSM Health Cardinal Glennon has provided care for children regardless of ability to pay. SSM Health Cardinal Glennon primarily serves children from eastern Missouri and southern Illinois, but also treats children across the United States and from countries around the world.

SSM Health Cardinal Glennon also serves as a teaching hospital affiliated with the neighboring Saint Louis University Schools of Medicine and Nursing, and nine other education institutes. SSM Health Cardinal Glennon is a member of SSM Health, one of the largest Catholic health care systems in the country. SSM Health is sponsored by the Franciscan Sisters of Mary and owns, operates and manages hospitals in four states — Missouri, Illinois, Wisconsin and Oklahoma. In 2002, SSM Health was the first health care organization in the country to be named a Malcolm Baldrige National Quality Award winner.

History
Originally named Cardinal Glennon Memorial Hospital for Children after John Cardinal Glennon the Archbishop of St. Louis from 1903 to 1946, the hospital first opened its doors on July 5, 1956. Dr. Peter G. Danis (father of Timothy J. Danis), Leo Wieck, Frank J. Guyol, and the Franciscan Sisters of Mary
were very instrumental regarding the founding of the hospital.

Departments
SSM Health Cardinal Glennon is ranked by U.S. News & World Report for their cardiology, gastroenterology, and nephrology departments in the 2017-2018 edition. It is home to more than 200 specialists in more than 60 areas of pediatric medical and surgical sub-specialties including cardiology and cardiothoracic surgery, critical care, emergency, ENT, gastroenterology/hepatology, hematology/oncology, neonatology, nephrology, neurology/neurosurgery, orthopedics, plastic surgery and pulmonology. Surgical services include fetal surgery and minimally invasive surgery.

SSM Health Cardinal Glennon, in partnership with Saint Louis University School of Medicine, offers 12 pediatric fellowship programs including allergy and immunology, anesthesia, cardiology, critical care, developmental/behavioral, emergency medicine, gastroenterology, hematology/oncology, neonatal, neurology, surgery and rheumatology. The hospital is home to the Level 1 pediatric trauma center and a Level 4 neonatal intensive care unit, both the highest available classification, and the St. Louis Fetal Care Institute. The St. Louis Fetal Care Institute is the only comprehensive fetal care center in middle America.

References

Hospital buildings completed in 1956
Hospitals in St. Louis
Saint Louis University
1956 establishments in Missouri
Buildings and structures in St. Louis
Children's hospitals in the United States
Pediatric trauma centers